Orlin Orlinov (Bulgarian: Орлин Орлинов; born 8 August 1988 in Teteven) is a Bulgarian football winger who plays for Septemvri Simitli.

Career
Orlinov started his professional career at Litex Lovech, for which he made his debut in the A PFG during season 2005/06 at the age of 17. In June 2006, he joined Slavia Sofia. He was loaned to Spartak Varna in the opening days of the 2009 January transfer market. To the end of the season Orlinov played 10 matches for Spartak and scored one goal against his previously club Slavia Sofia.

On 3 July 2009, Orlinov signed a one-year contract with the option for extension for another two with CSKA Sofia. His time with CSKA has been marred by some disciplinary issues. In March 2010 he was arrested for kidnapping model, reality TV star and television reporter Katrin Vacheva and assaulting her for several hours. She was left with a broken nose, concussion and brain injuries. She said to police that, "He dragged me for a few metres, there was a trail of blood. He said – you are a beautiful woman, and all beautiful women deserve to be beaten."

In July 2012, Orlinov joined Turkish amateur side Didim Belediyespor.

References

External links

1988 births
Living people
Bulgarian footballers
Association football midfielders
First Professional Football League (Bulgaria) players
Second Professional Football League (Bulgaria) players
PFC Litex Lovech players
PFC Slavia Sofia players
PFC Spartak Varna players
PFC CSKA Sofia players
FC Lyubimets players
PFC Pirin Gotse Delchev players
FC Septemvri Simitli players
Bulgarian expatriate sportspeople in Turkey
Expatriate footballers in Turkey
Bulgarian expatriate footballers